Alexandre Diogo Machado, nicknamed Careca, is an Angolan handball coach for Angolan handball club Interclube and the Angolan national team.

He coached the team at the 2017 World Men's Handball Championship.

References

Angolan handball coaches
Living people
Year of birth missing (living people)